A list of films produced in the historical country of Czechoslovakia. As yet only work has been completed on 1898–1935. For films of the Czech Republic from 1991 onwards please see List of Czech Republic films.

1898–1918
(as part of Austria-Hungary)

1919

1920s

1930s

1940s

1950s

1960s

1970s

1980s

External links